The House of White of Tuxford and Wallingwells is an ancient family, which primarily lived in Nottinghamshire over many centuries. From 1802 the head of the family has been a baronet, the title having been conferred on Sir Thomas Woollaston White, 1st Bt. by King George III.

List of Heads of the Family 
People noted in italics are those who would have succeeded as the head of the family had they survived their elder brother.

References 

English families